Mali Kyun (Tavoy Island) is an island in the Mergui Archipelago, Burma (Myanmar).

See also
List of islands of Burma

References

External links
Myanmar Ecotourism - Ministry of Hotels and Tourism
Mergui Archipelago Photos

Mergui Archipelago